The Paralympic sports comprise all the sports contested in the Summer and Winter Paralympic Games. As of 2020, the Summer Paralympics included 22 sports and 539 medal events, and the Winter Paralympics include 5 sports and disciplines and about 80 events. The number and kinds of events may change from one Paralympic Games to another.

The Paralympic Games are a major international multi-sport event for athletes with physical disabilities or intellectual impairments. This includes athletes with mobility disabilities, amputations, blindness, and cerebral palsy. Paralympic sports refers to organized competitive sporting activities as part of the global Paralympic movement. These sports are organized and run under the supervision of the International Paralympic Committee and other international sports federations.

History

Organized sport for persons with physical disabilities developed out of rehabilitation programs. Following World War II, in response to the needs of large numbers of injured ex-service members and civilians, sport was introduced as a key part of rehabilitation. Sport for rehabilitation grew into recreational sport and then into competitive sport. The pioneer of this approach was Ludwig Guttmann of the Stoke Mandeville Hospital in England. In 1948, while the Olympic Games were being held in London, England, he organized a sports competition for wheelchair athletes at Stoke Mandeville. This was the origin of the Stoke Mandeville Games, which evolved into the modern Paralympic Games.

Organization

Globally, the International Paralympic Committee is recognized as the leading organization, with direct governance of nine sports, and responsibility over the Paralympic Games and other multi-sport, multi-disability events. Other international organizations, notably the International Wheelchair and Amputee Sports Federation (IWAS), the International Blind Sports Federation (IBSA), International Sports Federation for Persons with Intellectual Disability (INAS) and the Cerebral Palsy International Sports and Recreation Association (CP-ISRA) govern some sports that are specific to certain disability groups.  In addition, certain single-sport federations govern sports for athletes with a disability, either as part of an able-bodied sports federation such as the International Federation for Equestrian Sports (FEI), or as a disabled sports federation such as the International Wheelchair Basketball Federation.

At the national level, there are a wide range of organizations that take responsibility for Paralympic sport, including National Paralympic Committees, which are members of the IPC, and many others.

Disability categories

Athletes who participate in Paralympic sport are grouped into ten major categories, based on their type of disability:

Physical Impairment - There are eight different types of physical impairment recognized by the movement:
 Impaired muscle power - With impairments in this category, the force generated by muscles, such as the muscles of one limb, one side of the body or the lower half of the body is reduced, e.g. due to spinal-cord injury, spina bifida or polio.
 Impaired passive range of movement - Range of movement in one or more joints is reduced in a systematic way. Acute conditions such as arthritis are not included.
 Loss of limb or limb deficiency - A total or partial absence of bones or joints from partial or total loss due to illness, trauma, or congenital limb deficiency (e.g. dysmelia).
 Leg-length difference - Significant bone shortening occurs in one leg due to congenital deficiency or trauma.
 Short stature - Standing height is reduced due to shortened legs, arms and trunk, which are due to a musculoskeletal deficit of bone or cartilage structures.
 Hypertonia - Hypertonia is marked by an abnormal increase in muscle tension and reduced ability of a muscle to stretch. Hypertonia may result from injury, disease, or conditions which involve damage to the central nervous system (e.g. cerebral palsy).
 Ataxia - Ataxia is an impairment that consists of a lack of coordination of muscle movements (e.g. cerebral palsy, Friedreich’s ataxia).
 Athetosis - Athetosis is generally characterized by unbalanced, involuntary movements and a difficulty maintaining a symmetrical posture (e.g. cerebral palsy, choreoathetosis).

Visual Impairment -  Athletes with visual impairment ranging from partial vision, sufficient to be judged legally blind, to total blindness. This includes impairment of one or more component of the visual system (eye structure, receptors, optic nerve pathway, and visual cortex). The sighted guides for athletes with a visual impairment are such a close and essential part of the competition that the athlete with visual impairment and the guide are considered a team. Beginning in 2012, these guides (along with sighted goalkeepers in 5-a-side football became eligible to receive medals of their own.

Intellectual Disability - Athletes with a significant impairment in intellectual functioning and associated limitations in adaptive behaviour. The IPC primarily serves athletes with physical disabilities, but the disability group Intellectual Disability has been added to some Paralympic Games. This includes only elite athletes with intellectual disabilities diagnosed before the age of 18. However, the IOC-recognized Special Olympics World Games are open to all people with intellectual disabilities.

The disability category determines who athletes compete against and which sports they participate in. Some sports are open to multiple disability categories (e.g. cycling), while others are restricted to only one (e.g. Five-a-side football). In some sports athletes from multiple categories compete, but only within their category (e.g. athletics), while in others athletes from different categories compete against one another (e.g. swimming). Events in the Paralympics are commonly labelled with the relevant disability category, such as Men's Swimming Freestyle S1, indicating athletes with a severe physical impairment, or Ladies Table Tennis 11, indicating athletes with an intellectual disability.

Classification

A major component of Paralympic sport is classification. Classification provides a structure for competition which allows athletes to compete against others with similar disabilities or similar levels of physical function. It is similar in aim to the weight classes or age categories used in some non-disabled sports.

Athletes are classified through a variety of processes that depend on their disability group and the sport they are participating in. Evaluation may include a physical or medical examination, a technical evaluation of how the athlete performs certain sport-related physical functions, and observation in and out of competition. Each sport has its own specific classification system which factors into the rules for Olympic competition in the sport.

Summer Paralympics

Current summer sports

The following table lists the currently practiced Paralympic sports,

Discontinued summer sports

Winter Paralympics

Current winter sports

Discontinued winter sports

Possible future winter sports
Bob Balk, the chairman of the International Paralympic Committee (IPC) Athletes' Council, launched a campaign in early 2012 to have sliding sports (bobsleigh, luge and skeleton) included at the 2018 Winter Paralympics in Pyeongchang, South Korea.

At the meeting in Madrid, Spain, on 10 and 11 September 2018, the IPC executive board announced that Para Bobsleigh had failed in some evaluation criteria and would not be part of the official program for the 2022 Winter Paralympic Games.

Abbreviations

Governing bodies:
 BISFed — Boccia International Sports Federation
 CP-ISRA — Cerebral Palsy International Sports and Recreation Association
 IFDS — International Association for Disabled Sailing
 IBSA — International Blind Sports Federation
 ICF — International Canoe Federation
 ICF — International Curling Federation
 FEI — International Federation for Equestrian Sports
 IPC — International Paralympic Committee (including Paralympic athletics, Paralympic DanceSport, Paralympic swimming, Paralympic shooting, Paralympic powerlifting, Para-alpine skiing, Paralympic biathlon, Paralympic cross-country skiing, Para ice hockey, Para snowboarding)
 INAS-FID — International Sports Federation for Persons with an Intellectual Disability
 FISA — International Rowing Federation
 ITTF — International Table Tennis Federation
 ITF — International Tennis Federation
 ITU — International Triathlon Union
 IWAS — International Wheelchair and Amputee Sport Federation
 IWBF — International Wheelchair Basketball Federation
 IWRF — International Wheelchair Rugby Federation
 UCI — International Cycling Union
 WCF — World Curling Federation
 WA — World Archery
 WOVD — World Organization Volleyball for Disabled

Notes

The categories listed represent all those groups that participate in this sport at some level. Not all these categories are represented in competition at the Paralympic Games.

The governing bodies listed represent those organizations responsible for the broadest level of participation. In some cases, other disability-specific organizations will also have some governance of athletes in that sport within their own group. For example, the IPC governs multi-disability athletics competitions such as the Paraympic Games; however, CP-ISRA, IBSA, and IWAS provide single-disability events in athletics for athletes with cerebral palsy, visually impaired athletes, and wheelchair and amputee athletes respectively.

Paralympic Games status details the years these sports were practiced as full medal events at the Paralympic Games.

See also

Olympic sports

References

External links
International Paralympic Committee
Paralympic sports at IPC web site
Cerebral Palsy International Sport and Recreation Association
International Blind Sports Association
INAS-FID: International Sports Federation for Persons with Intellectual Disability
International Wheelchair and Amputee Sports Federation
Discussion forum of Disabled sports

 
 
 
Sports at multi-sport events by competition